Kuntur Qaqa (Quechua kuntur condor, qaqa rock, "condor rock", also spelled Condor Khakha) is a  mountain in the Bolivian Andes. It is situated in the Potosí Department, Tomás Frías Province, in the north of the Potosí Municipality.

References 

Mountains of Potosí Department